The Young Greens of Albania or Youth forum of the Green Party of Albania ( or , abbreviated as FRGJ) is the Green politics, Environmentalism and Social democracy youth organisation of Albania. Although independent, the Youth forum of the Green Party of Albania are affiliated with the Albanian party PGJ. The current leader is Olsi Bakalli.

The Forum of Young Greens of Albania is full member of the Federation of Young European Greens.

Forum leaders
 Chairman of Green Youth and Press Spokesman the Green Party
Orlando Bakalli

 Vice Chairperson
Orsena Lama

 Secretary general
Rodion Gjoka

 Green Club and Electronic Information secretary
Selda Papajani

 Secretary of Human Resources and Activities
Xherri Mullaj

External links
 Young Greens of Albania

References

Youth wings of political parties in Albania
Albania
2001 establishments in Albania
Political parties established in 2001